Franco Antonelli (28 March 1934 – 31 January 2022) was an Italian male long-distance runner who competed at the 1960 Summer Olympics.

Antonelli died on 31 January 2022 in Torino, Italy.

National titles
He won a national championships at senior level.

Italian Athletics Championships
10,000 metres: 1961

References

External links
 

1934 births
2022 deaths
Athletes (track and field) at the 1960 Summer Olympics
Italian male long-distance runners
Olympic athletes of Italy
Sportspeople from the Province of Perugia